Tripura State, also known as Hill Tipperah, was a princely state in India during the period of the British Raj and for some two years after the departure of the British. Its rulers belonged to the Manikya dynasty and until August 1947 the state was in a subsidiary alliance, from which it was released by the Indian Independence Act 1947. The state acceded to the newly independent Indian Union on 13 August 1947, and subsequently merged into the Indian Union in October 1949.

The princely state was located in the present-day Indian state of Tripura. The state included one town, Agartala, as well as a total of 1,463 villages. It had an area of 10,660 km2 and a population of 513,000 inhabitants in 1941.

History

The predecessor state of Tripura was founded about 100 AD. According to legend the Manikya dynasty derived its name from a jewel ('Mani' in Sanskrit) that had been obtained from a frog. The first king who ruled the state under the royal title of Manikya was Maharaja Maha Manikya, who ascended the throne in 1400. 
The kingdom is mentioned in Ming Shilu as Di-wu-la. It is further stated that it was occupied by Da-Gu-la, a unidentified state in what is Northern Myanmar or Assam.
The Rajmala, a chronicle of the Kings of Tripura, was written in Bengali verse in the 15th century under Dharma Manikya I. The kingdom of Tripura reached its maximum expansion in the 16th century.

In 1764, when the British East India Company took control of Bengal, the parts of Bengal that had been under the Mughal Empire were taken over by the British administration. In 1809, Tripura became a British protectorate, and in 1838 the Rajas of Tripura were recognised by the British as sovereigns.

Between 1826 and 1862 the eastern part was subject to the ravages caused by Kuki invaders that plundered and destroyed villages and massacred their inhabitants.

There were troubles in every succession among the Tripura royal family members when the aspiring princes often resorted to use the services of the Kukis to cause disturbances. Thus in 1904, the British enacted a sanad that regulated permanently the succession of the royal family. Thenceforward the succession would have to be recognised by the Viceroy of India representing the British Crown.

Bir Chandra Manikya (1862–1896) modelled his administration on the pattern of British India, and enacted reforms including the foundation of the Agartala Municipal Corporation. 

In 1905, Tripura became part of the new province of Eastern Bengal and Assam and was designated as 'Hill Tippera'. In addition to the Hill Tippera area, which corresponds to Tripura State, the kings retained a fertile estate known as Chakla Roshanbad with an area of 1476 km2, located in the flatland of Noakhali, Sylhet and Tipperah districts; the latter is now mostly included in the Comilla District of Bangladesh.

King Bir Bikram Kishore Debbarma died in May 1947, shortly before Indian Independence. His son Kirit Bikram Kishore was a minor at that time, and, so, Maharani Kanchan Prava Devi presided over the Council of Regency formed to govern the state. On 13 August 1947, the Maharani signed the Instrument of Accession, joining the Indian Union. There was turmoil in the state in the succeeding months and several changes in the administrative structure took place in quick succession. Finally, on 9 September 1949, the Maharani signed the Merger Agreement with the Dominion of India, which became effective on 15 October, and Tripura became a centrally administered Part C State (Chief Commissioner's Province) of India.

Kirit Pradyot Deb Barman (b. 1978) was the son of the last King - and is the current titular monarch.

Rulers
The head of the royal family of Tripura held the title of 'Maharaja' from 1919 onwards. Since 1897 the rulers were entitled to a 13 gun salute by the British authorities.

Rajas
> 1978- (age 44 years), Pradyot Bikram Manikya Deb Barma (Last king),
1684 – 1712 Ratna Manikya II (2nd time) (d. 1712)
1712 – 1714 Mahendra Manikya
1714 – 1732 Dharma Manikya II (1st time)
1732 – 1733 Jagat Manikya
1733 Dharma Manikya II (2nd time)
1733 – 1737 Mukunda Manikya (d. 1739) 
1737 – 1739 Jai Manikya II (1st time)
1739 – 174. Indrasya Manikya II (1st time)
17.. – 174. Udai Manikya
174. – 174. Jai Manikya II (2nd time)
174. – 174. Indrasya Manikya II (2nd time)
174. – 1743 Jai Manikya II (3rd time)
1743 – 1760 Bijaya Manikya III
c. 1748 – c. 1758 Shamsher Gazi -Regent (d. c. 1758)
1760 Lakshman Manikya (d. 1760)
1760 – 1761 Krishna Manikya (1st time) (d. 1783)
1761 – 1767 Balaram Manikya
1767 – 11 July 1783 Krishna Manikya (2nd time) (s.a.)
11 July 1783 – Mar 1804 Rajadhara Manikya II (d. 1804)
11 July 1783 – 1786 Jahnavi Rani (RM)Mahadevayu (f) -Regent
Mar 1804 – 18 October 1809 Ramaganga Manikya (1st time) (b. 17.. – d. 1826)
18 October 1809 – 6 April 1813 Durga Manikya (b. 17.. – d. 1813)
 6 April 1813 – 14 November 1826 Ramaganga Manikya (2nd time) (s.a.)
14 November 1826 – 19 March 1830 Kashichandra Manikya (d. 1830)
19 March 1830 – 3 April 1849 Krishna Kishor Manikya (d. 1849)
 3 April 1849 – 31 July 1862 Ishanachandra Manikya (b. 1829 – d. 1862)
31 July 1862 – 11 December 1896 Virachandra Manikya (b. 1838 – d. 1896) (personal style Maharaja from 24 October 1877)
31 July 1862 – 9 March 1870 .... - Regent
11 December 1896 – 12 March 1909 Radha Kishor Manikya (b. 1857 – d. 1909)
12 March 1909 – 1 January 1919 Virendra Kishor Manikya (b. 1883 – d. 1923)

Maharajas
1 January 1919 – 13 August 1923 Virendra Kishor Manikya
17 August 1923 – 17 May 1947 Vira Vikrama Kishor Manikya (born 1908, died 1947) (after 3 June 1935 called Sir Vira Vikrama Kishor Manikya)
17 May 1947 – 15 October 1949 Manikya Kirit Bikram Kishore Deb Burman, a minor (born 1933 – died 2006) - reigned as a titular ruler until his death, but unrecognised after 1971 by the Indian government
17 May 1947 – 15 October 1949 Maharani Kanchan Prabhavati Mahadevi, Regent (born 1914, died 1973)

Dewans (chief ministers)
1850 – 1857? Balaram Hazari
18.. – 18.. Braja Mohan Thakur
18.. – 1873 Dinabandhu Thakur
Jul 1873 – 1877 Nilmoni Das
1877 – 1880 Sambhu Chandra Mukherjee
1880 – 1883 ....
1883 Prince Radakishore
1883 – 1886 Dhanajaya Thakur
1886 (3 months) Babu Dinanath Sen
1886 – November 1888 Rai Bahadur Mohini Mohan Bardhan
November 1888 – 1890? the Raja
1890 – 1892 Rai Umakanta Das Bahadur (1st time)
1892 – 1901? Dinabandhu Thakur
1901 – 1905 Rai Umakanta Das Bahadur (2nd time)
November 1905 – February 1907 Shri Ramani Mohan Chattopadhyaya
February 1907 – December 1908 Rai Umakanta Das Bahadur (3rd time)
December 1908 – 7 November 1909 Sirjukta Babu Annada Charan Gupta
November 1909 – 1914 Nabadwip Chandra Deb Barma (b. 1854 – d. 1931)
1914 – 1915 Brajendra Kishore Deb Barma (b. 1880 – d. 19..) (1st time)
1915 – 1923 Srijut Babu Prasanna Kumar Deb Barma
 9 December 1923 – 19 August 1927 Nabadwipchandra Dev Burma (s.a.) (1st time)
1927 – 1929 Jyotis Chandra Sen (1st time)
17 May 1929 – 1931? Nabadwipchandra Dev Burma (s.a.) (2nd time)
1931 – 28 August 1932 B.K. Sen
28 August 1932 – 20 November 1932 Manyabara Rana Bodhjung Bahadur (b. 1894 – d. 1946)
20 Nov 1932 – 1939/40 Jyotis Chandra Sen (2nd time)
1939/40 – 18 November 1946 Manyabara Rana Bodhjung Bahadur
November 1946 – 1947 Brajendra Kishore Deb Barma (s.a.) (2nd time)
1947 S.V. Mukherjee
20 December 1947 – 15 October 1949 Abani Bushan Chatterjee

British political agents
 3 July 1871 – February 1874 Ambrose William Bushe Power (b. 18.. – d. 1907)
11 February 1874 – May 1875 Edward Gordon Lillingston
27 May 1875 – February 1876 W.L. Samuels
22 August 1876 – April 1877 Thomas Edward Coxhead (b. 1842 – d. 1890)
February 1877 – April 1877 James Francis Bradbury (acting for Coxhead)
26 April 1877 – 28 October 1878 C.W. Bolton
1878 – 1879 F. Jones
1879 – 1882 G. Toynbee

Symbols

Flag 

The flag features the coat of arms, on a background of saffron and red.

Coat of Arms 

The motto is "Bir ta Saramekam" (Courage is the one thing most needed or nothing is better than a warrior).

See also

Eastern States Agency
Political integration of India
Tripura Merger Agreement
Tripura Buranji

Notes

References

External links

Kings & Royal Families of Tripura 
Manipuri Queens in the Royal House of Tripura – A Historical Study
Tripura ruling dynasty

States and territories disestablished in 1949
Princely states of India
History of Tripura
Bengal Presidency
1809 establishments in India
1949 disestablishments in India